The American Police Hall of Fame & Museum is located at 6350 Horizon Drive just south of Titusville, Florida, adjacent to the Astronaut Hall of Fame.  It houses law enforcement exhibits, a memorial and a Hall of Fame. It is the nation's first national police museum and a memorial dedicated to law enforcement officers killed in the line of duty.

The museum was founded in 1960 in North Port, Florida by Gerald Arenberg. He was a police officer injured in the line of duty by a drunk driver in 1955.  It was his dream to build a memorial to honor all law enforcement officers killed in the line of duty, those that paid the ultimate sacrifice to keep the peace, to protect, and to serve. The museum was moved from North Port to the former FBI building in Miami, Florida in 1990. This building had 3 floors, housing the museum on the first 2 floors and the administration offices on the 3rd floor. By 2000 this facility became too small to house the growing number of exhibits, as well as the growing number of names in the 
memorial. In 2001, building began on the museum in Titusville.  This facility opened in May, 2003.  The Space Coast area was chosen because of its  proximity to the Kennedy Space Center Visitor Complex, the United States Astronaut Hall of Fame, and Orlando.

The museum is supported and maintained by the National Association of Chiefs of Police. U.S. National Police Surgeon Linval K. Fleetwood MD, nominated by Chief Arenberg and appointed by U.S. President Bill Clinton, served the mission of the Hall of Fame & Museum from 1996 to 2007 by advising Congress about police issues, performing ceremonies for officers killed in the line of duty, and providing counseling for the families of those officers.

References

External links

Websites
American Police Hall of Fame & Museum official website
American Police Hall of Fame & Museum. Museum information from DISCOVER North Brevard Florida website.
American Police Hall of Fame & Museum Titusville, Florida. Museum Info webpage from MuseumUSA.org.
National Association of Chiefs of Police. Museum Info from About Us .

Web articles
American Police Hall of Fame and Museum by RoadsideAmerica.com

Police
History museums in Florida
Law enforcement museums in the United States
Museums established in 1960
Museums in Brevard County, Florida
Buildings and structures in Titusville, Florida
1960 establishments in Florida
Law enforcement in Florida